The 1963–64 1.Lig was the sixth season of professional football in Turkey. The league was re-branded as the 1.Lig following the creation of a second division known as the 2.Lig. Fenerbahçe won their third title, becoming the first club to do so. Güven Önüt, forward for Beşiktaş, finished top scorer of the league with 19 goals. He was the first player in club history to finish top scorer.

Overview 
Fenerbahçe won their third top-flight title and Beşiktaş finished runners-up for the second time. Galatasaray rounded out the top three. Fenerbahçe qualified for the 1964–65 European Cup and Beşiktaş qualified for the Balkans Cup. Because Galatasaray had already qualified for the European Cup Winners' Cup, Göztepe took their place at the Inter–Cities Fairs Cup. No clues were promoted, while Karşıyaka, Beyoğluspor and Kasımpaşa were relegated.

The Turkish Football Federation claimed that the result of the Karşıyaka and Kasımpaşa match, which originally finished as a 4–0 win for Karşıyaka, was fixed beforehand. As a result, the TFF changed the win to a 0–3 loss for Karşıyaka. The club was penalized 3 points. The change dropped Karşiyaka into the relegation zone, and they were relegated to the 2.Lig. Karşıyaka challenged the decision, and took the TFF to civil court. Two years later, the civil court overturned the TFF's ruling, and Karşıyaka were allowed to join the 1.Lig again in 1966–67.

Final league table

Results

References 

Süper Lig seasons
1963–64 in Turkish football
Turkey